Hudson is an English masculine given name which originated from the surname Hudson.

People with the given name Hudson
Hudson (footballer, born 1986), Hudson Fernando Tobias de Carvalho, Brazilian football right-back
Hudson (footballer, born 1988), Hudson Rodrigues dos Santos, Brazilian football defensive midfielder
Hudson (footballer, born 1996), Hudson Felipe Gonçalves, Brazilian football midfielder
Hudson Armerding (1918–2009), American educator and historian
Hudson Austin (1938–2022), Grenadian general
Hudson Bell, American musician
Hudson Card (born 2001), American football player
Hudson Creighton, Australian rugby union player
Hudson B. Cox, American lawyer
Hudson Fasching (born 1995), American ice hockey player
Hudson Fysh (1895–1974), Australian World War One soldier and co-founder of Qantas Airways
Hudson Gurney (1775–1864), English writer and politician
Hudson Jesus (born 1991), Brazilian footballer
Hudson Kearley, 1st Viscount Devonport (1856–1934), British politician
Hudson Leick (born 1969), American actress
Hudson Lowe (1769–1844), British army general
Hudson Maxim, American inventor and chemist
Hudson Mohawke (born 1986), the stage name of Scottish electronic music producer Ross Matthew Birchard
Hudson R. Sours, American lawyer and politician
Hudson de Souza (born 1977), Brazilian middle distance runner
Hudson Stuck, Episcopalian Archbishop in Alaska who organized the first expedition to summit Mount McKinley
Hudson Taylor (disambiguation), multiple people
Hudson Tuttle (1836–1910), American Spiritualist author and publisher
Hudson Yang (born 2003), American actor

Fictional characters
 Hudson Hawk, played by Bruce Willis
 Doc Hudson, played by Paul Newman
 Hudson Gimble from Nickelodeon's Game Shakers, played by Thomas Kuc

Notes

Masculine given names
English masculine given names
Given names originating from a surname